The following is a list of media outlets for Hamilton, Ontario:

Radio
Hamilton has seven FM stations and three AM radio stations.  Two of the stations are operated by local post-secondary institutions, one is news/talk and one airs a comedy format.

On September 19, 2007, the CBC organized a meeting in Hamilton at the Hamilton Convention Centre to discuss the idea of bringing a new radio station to the city, citing that "Hamilton was the largest, and most underrepresented city in the country in terms of media coverage." In early 2012, the CBC confirmed its final plans for a new local news service in Hamilton; see "web" section below for further details.

 AM 820 - CHAM, ("Funny 820"), comedy
 AM 900 - CHML, ("AM900 CHML"), news/talk
 AM 1150 - CKOC, ("BNN Bloomberg Radio 1150") Business news
 FM 93.3 - CFMU, McMaster University radio
 FM 94.7 - CHKX, ("KX 94.7"), country
 FM 95.3 - CING, ("Energy 95.3"), hot adult contemporary
 FM 101.5 - CIOI, ("Indi 101.5"), Mohawk College radio
 FM 102.9 - CKLH, ("Bounce 102.9"), adult hits
 FM 107.9 - CJXY, ("Y108"), active rock (licensed to Burlington but marketed toward Hamilton)

Most of Toronto's radio stations also cover Hamilton.

To see a list of defunct radio stations in Hamilton, see Canadian Communications Foundation.

Television
Hamilton is part of the Toronto television market and receives most broadcast television from Toronto. CHCH is the only television whose studios and operations are based out of Hamilton, and provides local programming. CITS is an owned & operated of the Yes TV system, but does not air any local programming, and is based out of neighboring Burlington.  CBC Television (CBLT-DT), City (CITY-DT), Radio-Canada Télé (CBLFT-DT) and TVOntario (CICA-DT) are received directly from the networks' Toronto transmitters on the CN Tower. CBC once had an affiliate in Hamilton, as CHCH was affiliated with the network from its sign on in 1954, until 1961. Global can be received from CIII-DT's Broadcast relay station in Paris, or the station's Toronto transmitter on the CN Tower; CTV service may be received either from CFTO-DT (Toronto) or CKCO-DT (Kitchener), with both stations available on most local cable systems. CTV Two is provided over-the-air by a local rebroadcaster, due to the distance of the CKVR-DT main transmitter in Barrie from Hamilton.

Television stations based in Hamilton include:

In addition, many of the Buffalo, New York TV stations reach Hamilton over the air and some are carried on local cable.

Cable service in Hamilton is divided up between two different cable companies: Cogeco and Rogers Cable (the former third independent company, Source Cable, is now a Rogers subsidiary). Each system holds a monopoly in a specific part of Hamilton.

Print

Newspapers
Hamilton Community News - formerly known as Brabant Newspapers, publishes weekly editions for Mountain News, Ancaster News, Dundas Star, and Stoney Creek News (now owned by Metroland Media Group)Hamilton Spectator - the city's main daily newspaper; established in 1846; has a daily circulation over 100,000 and over 300,000 weekly readers; owned by Metroland Media Group, a division of TorstarFlamborough Review - weekly community paper; owned by Metroland Media GroupPresencia Latina - monthly Spanish-language community paperLe Régional - weekly French-language community paper

Other publicationsBiz Magazine -  published by Town MediaCoffee News - Ancaster editionCoffee News - Dundas/Westdale editionCoffee News - Waterdown editionGreater Hamilton Musician Annual - a printed compilation of local music newsGusto Magazine - free monthly independent wellness magazine for Hamilton Ontario; creator Amy BoninH MagazineHamilton Arts & Letters - online magazine published by Samizdat PressHamilton Magazine - published by Town Media, a division of Sun MediaMayday Magazine- a publication of the Sky Dragon CentreThe Sachem and Glanbrook GazetteUnpack Magazine - print and online magazine published by the Immigrant Women's CentreUrbanicity - published by Martinus Geleynse; creator Reg BeaudryView Magazine'' - local entertainment weekly

Web

In 2012, the Canadian Broadcasting Corporation announced its plans for a new local news service in Hamilton. With the Hamilton area already within the broadcast range of CBC Radio and CBC Television's services in Toronto, it was not financially or technically feasible for the public broadcaster to launch new conventional radio or television stations in Hamilton; accordingly, the corporation has developed a new model, with Hamilton as its test project, to launch a local digital service that would be accessible on the Internet and telecommunications devices such as tablets and smartphones. The project, CBC Hamilton, launched in May 2012.

Local websites include:
 Greater Hamilton Musician - news for musicians and the music trade in Hamilton, Burlington, Oakville and Brantford; reviews, interviews 
 Hamilton Scores! - Hamilton amateur sports news
 Hamilton Tigers - dedicated to bringing the NHL back to Hamilton
 Hamilton Music Awards - annual music awards for bands and artists from the Hamilton region
 Here Magazine - dedicated to local news, mostly arts based
 Urbanicity - daily news articles specializing in openings & closures of local spots
 Raise the Hammer - dedicated to sustainable urban revitalization
 Software Hamilton - covers local tech and startups
 THEZine Arts & Events E-Blasts - online arts, entertainment and business promotion covering Hamilton and the Golden Horseshoe regions

References

Hamilton
Media, Hamilton